Catholic University of the North (Spanish: Universidad Católica del Norte (UCN)) is a university in Chile. It is part of the Chilean Traditional Universities. It is located in Antofagasta, Chile. The Catholic University of the North was founded on May 31, 1956.

The current rector is Jorge Tabilo Álvarez.

Organization 

The Catholic University of Norte has 7 faculties, 20 departments, 8 schools, 3 institutes, 7 research centres and a Scientific and Technological Park  that are situated in four main locations:

 Campus Casa Central in Antofagasta
 Campus Guayacán in Coquimbo
 Museum and research centre in San Pedro de Atacama
 Sierra Vicuña Mackenna, Taltal (for astronomy purposes)

Other locations:
 Center of MBA de la facultad de economía y administración, Calama
 Oficinas Santiago (Representación ante el DEMRE y postulaciones)
 Departamento de Clínicas - Facultad de Medicina
 Al interior del Hospital San Pablo de Coquimbo 
 Frente al Hospital San Juan de Dios de La Serena
Museums:
 Museo Geológico Profesor Humberto Fuenzalida V.
 Museo Arqueológico R. P. Gustavo Le Paige de San Pedro de Atacama
 Museo del Desierto de Atacama, Sector ruinas de Huanchaca (Alianza Enjoy-UCN Bicentenario)

Technical Training Centers:
 Centro de Educación y Capacitación de la Universidad Católica del Norte (CeducUCN)
 Sedes Coquimbo (Casa Central), Antofagasta y Lebu.

Faculties and Educational Programs 

 Facultad de Ciencias
 Pregrado
 Carrera de Química y Farmacia
 Carrera de Licenciatura en Física. Mención en Astronomía
 Carrera de Licenciatura en Matemática
 Carrera de Química Ambiental - Química en  Metalurgia Extractiva
 Carrera de Analista Químico
 Carrera de Licenciatura en Química
 Postgrado
 Magíster en Ciencias Mención en Matemáticas
 Doctorado en Ciencias Mención en Matemáticas
 Facultad de Humanidades
 Carrera de Periodismo
 Carrera de Psicología
 Carrera de Pedagogía en Ingles y/o Traducción  Bilingüe
Escuela de Derecho
Escuela de Arquitectura
 Pregrado
 Carrera de Arquitectura
 Postgrado
 Magíster en Arquitectura
Facultad de Ciencias del Mar
Facultad de Economía y Administración
 Facultad de Ingeniería y Ciencias Geológicas
 Pregrado
 Carrera de Geología
 Carrera de Ingeniería Civil en Computación e Informática
 Carrera de Ingeniería Civil Industrial
 Carrera de Ingeniería Civil Metalurgia
 Carrera de Ingeniería Civil Química
 Carrera de Ingeniería Ejecución en Computación e Informática
 Carrera de Ingeniería Ejecución en Procesos Químicos
 Carrera de Ingeniería Ejecución en Metalurgia
 Carrera de Ingeniería Civil Ambiental
 Postgrado
 Magíster en Geología Económica. Mención Exploración
 Magíster en Aplicaciones de Ingeniería Ambiental
 Programa de Doctorado en Ciencias. Mención Geología
 Facultad Ciencias de Ingeniería y Construcción
 Carrera de Ingeniería en Construcción
 Carrera de Ingeniería Civil

See also 

 University homepage

References

 
Catholic universities and colleges in Chile
Buildings and structures in Antofagasta
Educational institutions established in 1956
Universities in Antofagasta Region
1956 establishments in Chile